Box 507 is a 2002 Spanish action thriller film directed by Enrique Urbizu which stars Antonio Resines and José Coronado. It is set in the Costa del Sol.

Cast

Release 
The film was theatrically released on 23 August 2002.

Awards and nominations 

|-
| align = "center" rowspan = "4" | 2002 || rowspan = "15" | 17th Goya Awards
| Best Supporting Actor || José Coronado ||  || rowspan = "4" | 
|-
| Best Production Supervision || Fernando Victoria de Lecea || 
|-
| Best Editing || Ángel Hernández Zoido || 
|-
| Best Sound || Licio Marcos de Oliveira, Luis de Veciana, Alfonso Pino ||

See also 
 List of Spanish films of 2002

References 
Citations

Bibliography

External links 
 Box 507 at ICAA's Catálogo de Cinespañol]

2002 action films
2002 films
Spanish action thriller films
Films set in Andalusia
2000s Spanish films
Sogecine films